Magnolia fraseri, commonly known as Fraser magnolia, mountain magnolia, earleaf cucumbertree, or mountain-oread, is a species of magnolia native to the south-eastern United States in the southern Appalachian Mountains and adjacent Atlantic and Gulf Coastal Plain from West Virginia south to northern Florida and west to eastern Texas.  The Appalachian plants are classified as Magnolia fraseri var. fraseri, and the more coastal plants as M. fraseri var. pyramidata.  These two kinds of magnolia are often recognized as distinct species, M. fraseri and M. pyramidata, respectively.

Fraser magnolia is a small, deciduous tree growing to 14 m (40 ft) tall, as a basal-branching, fragrant plant, with brown bark with a "warty" or "scaly" texture. The leaves are quite large, 15–25 cm (rarely up to 53 cm) long and 8–18 cm (rarely up to 29 cm) broad, with a pair of auricles (or "ear-lobes") at the base and an entire margin; they are green above and glaucous blue-green below. The showy white flowers are 16–25 cm in diameter with nine tepals; they open in late spring or early summer, after the foliage. The fruit is a woody, oblong, cone-like structure (like all Magnolias) 6.5–12 cm long, covered in small, pod-like follicles each containing one or two red seeds that hang out from the cone by a slender thread when ripe. A good seed crop occurs only about every 4–5 years. Reproduction is accomplished by both seed and vegetative sprouts. The fruit is eaten by wildlife, helping disperse the seeds.

This tree grows best on rich, moist, well-drained soil. The very large showy white flowers and large-leaved, coarse-textured foliage make this an attractive ornamental tree, but otherwise it has little commercial value. It is sometimes cultivated in North America as a native alternative to exotic magnolias, and can be grown a considerable distance north of its natural range if given conditions favorable to its growth.

There are two varieties:
Magnolia fraseri var. fraseri, native to the Appalachian Mountains.
Magnolia fraseri var. pyramidata (Bartram) Pampanini, from the Coastal Plain. The vernacular name for this variety is Pyramid magnolia.

The bigleaf magnolia (Magnolia macrophylla) also has auriculate-lobed leaves.

Fraser Magnolia is named for the Scottish botanist John Fraser (1750–1811), who collected extensively in the Appalachian Mountains.

Gallery

References

Hunt, D., ed. (1998). Magnolias and their allies. International Dendrology Society & Magnolia Society. .
Sternberg, G. (2004). Native Trees for North American Landscapes pp. 264. Timber Press, Inc.

External links
Magnolia fraseri images at the Arnold Arboretum of Harvard University Plant Image Database
https://archive.today/20060311195300/http://wildwnc.org/trees/Magnolia_fraseri.html (wildwnc.org)
Photos of flowers and foliage
Magnolia fraseri images at bioimages.vanderbilt.edu
Interactive Distribution Map of Magnolia fraseri

fraseri
Plants described in 1788
Trees of the Southeastern United States